Sirina may refer to
Sirina Camara (born 1991), French football player
Sirina (river), a small tributary of the Danube in Romania
Irina Sirina (born 1967), Russian-born Hungarian handball player
Jakub Šiřina (born 1987), Czech basketball player
Mestolobes sirina, a moth